Carphontes paradoxus is a species of longhorn beetles of the subfamily Lamiinae. It was described by Monne and Monne in 2010, and is known from Venezuela.

References

Beetles described in 2010
Acanthocinini